Corixa is a genus of aquatic bugs in the family Corixidae. The fossil species C. elegans is from the Rott Formation in Nordrhein-Westfalen (Oligocene of Germany).

References

External links 
 
 
 
 
 

Corixini
Nepomorpha genera